Te Tai Tokerau is a New Zealand parliamentary Māori electorate that was created out of the Northern Maori electorate ahead of the first Mixed Member Proportional (MMP) election in 1996. It was held first by Tau Henare representing New Zealand First for one term, and then Dover Samuels of the Labour Party for two terms. From 2005 to 2014, it was held by MP Hone Harawira. Initially a member of the Māori Party, Harawira resigned from both the party and then Parliament, causing the 2011 by-election. He was returned under the Mana Party banner in July 2011 and confirmed at the November 2011 general election.

Population centres 
Te Tai Tokerau's boundaries are similar to those of the pre-Mixed Member Proportional (MMP) Northern Maori electorate. Te Tai Tokerau was created ahead of the first MMP election in 1996. In the 2002 boundary redistribution, the size of the electorate shrank to make room for an increase in the number of Māori electorates from six to seven. The boundaries were not further altered in the 2007 or 2013/14 redistributions.

Te Tai Tokerau is the northernmost Māori electorate, and covers an area between Cape Reinga in the Far North of the North Island to a boundary cutting through West Auckland. The major population centres are Whangārei, the Bay of Islands and north and west Auckland. The electorate contains all of the Ngāpuhi, Te Aupōuri, Ngāti Kuri, Te Rarawa and Ngāti Kahu tribal areas, and part of Ngāti Whātua's territory (rohe).

History 

Northern Maori had been held by the Labour Party since the 1938 election, when longstanding Reform MP Taurekareka Henare was beaten by Labour's Paraire Karaka Paikea. In 1993, after 55 years of his party holding the seat, Labour MP Bruce Gregory was beaten by Henare's great-grandson, Tau Henare, standing for New Zealand First, ending Labour's unbroken hold on the four Māori seats. Henare went on to win Te Tai Tokerau after the switch to MMP, and New Zealand First won all five of the newly drawn Māori electorates.

After a tumultuous parliamentary term which saw all but one of the five New Zealand First Māori MPs defect to other parties, (including Henare himself, who went on to found Mauri Pacific), Labour won all six Māori electorates contested at the 1999 election. In Te Tai Tokerau, Tau Henare was beaten into third place behind the New Zealand First candidate and Dover Samuels, who Henare had beaten three years previous.

However, Labour's losing the five Māori electorates in 1996 showed that the Māori vote was contestable for the first time in five decades, as the new electoral system coupled with the rise of small parties meant that non-Labour candidacy in these seats was more feasible than under First Past the Post.

The New Zealand foreshore and seabed controversy of 2004–05 proved to be the catalyst for the second challenge to Labour party domination of the Māori electorates, this time from the Māori Party. At the 2005 election, Samuels and three other Labour Māori MPs lost their seats to Māori Party challengers. In Te Tai Tokerau, the winner was Hone Harawira.

Harawira resigned from the Māori Party in early 2011 and became an independent MP. On 11 May 2011, he resigned from Parliament effective 20 May, seeking a mandate for his new party, the Mana Party. This caused the 25 June 2011 by-election, which was contested by five parties, with the main contenders Harawira, Kelvin Davis (Labour Party) and Solomon Tipene (Māori Party). Harawira retained the electorate with a majority of 1,117, his previous majority being over 6,000. In the 2011 general election some months later, Harawira had a similar majority to Davis.

The Mana Party formed a coalition with the Internet Party just prior to the 2014 New Zealand general election. The coalition was registered with the Electoral Commission as the Internet Party and Mana Movement in July 2014, allowing it to contest the party vote. The Internet Party was founded by controversial online millionaire Kim Dotcom, and this strategic coalition resulted in Harawira's main opponent, Labour's Kelvin Davis, getting endorsements from Winston Peters of New Zealand First and the Prime Minister, John Key of the National Party. Even the electorate's candidate for the Māori Party, Te Hira Paenga, reminded voters of the importance of strategic voting. In his fourth challenge in the Te Tai Tokerau electorate, Davis ousted the incumbent Harawira, which ended the representation of the Mana Party in Parliament.

Members of Parliament
Key

List MPs
Members of Parliament elected from party lists in elections where that person also unsuccessfully contested Te Tai Tokerau. Unless otherwise stated, all MPs terms began and ended at general elections.

Election results

2020 election

2017 election

2014 election

2011 election

1Swings against both Harawira (Mana Party) and Shortland (Māori Party) are calculated against Harawira's Māori Party vote in 

Electorate (as at 26 November 2011): 33,797

2011 by-election

2008 election

2005 election

2002 election

1999 election

1996 election

References

Māori electorates
1996 establishments in New Zealand